Chakra Dhari is a 1948 Indian Tamil-language film produced by Gemini Studios. V. Nagayya and Pushpavalli star, while Gemini Ganesan who was a budding actor then, appeared in a minor role.

Plot
Gora is a potter who lives in a village near  Pandharpur in Maharashtra. He is a strong devotee of Lord Panduranga. He is not interested in earning money which worries his wife Thulasi. Venkat is Gora's elder brother and an affluent man. His wife Sona does not like Gora and his family. One day while Gora was mixing clay, his child Hari comes there, playing. Gora was in a devotional ecstasy and did not notice his child. The child is killed trampled under the mud. Thulasi threatens to destroy the idol of Panduranga but Gora tries to kill her with an axe. She tells Gora that he should not touch her in future and he also vows that he will not touch her. However, Thulasi gets her sister Shantha to marry her husband Gora so that they can beget a child. But Gora refuses to touch Shantha too. The sisters seduce Gora one night. Gora is shocked and cuts his hands for breaking the vows. Lord Panduranga and his consort Rukmini come in disguise and work for Gora. Due to their divine powers happiness is restored in the family. Gora gets back his hands and Hari come back alive. The whole family becomes devotees of Lord Panduranga.

Cast
Adapted from the film credits. (See External links)

Nagayya as Gorakumbar
Pushpavalli as Thulasi Bai
Suryaprabha as Shantha Bai
Nagarcoil Mahadevan as Namadhevar
L. Narayana Rao as Venkaji
K. N. Kamalam as Sona
Ganesh as Pandurangan
Varalakshmi as Rukmani
S. Krishnamoorthy as Penda
Subbaiah Pillai as Sevaji
T. V. Kalyani as Parvathi Bai
Nandi Velayutham as Guard
G. V. Sharma as Goldsmith
Baba Narayanan as Mali

N. Thyagarajan as Astrologer
M. Ramamoorthi, V. P. S. Mani,N. Narasimhan, Raja Rao,K. T. K. S. Mani as Thieves
Balaraman, K. Sampathkumar as Officers
Panduranga Das, T. S. B. Rao,Vijaya Rao as Bhandari Devotees
Chopra and A. Chandra as Dancers
S. R. Lakshmi as Betel Seller
Kumari V. Thulasi as Flower Seller
B. Ramakrishna Rao as Bangle Seller
Pudukottai Seenu as Areca Nut Seller 
Balan as Beggar

=

Production
This tale has been filmed many times in many languages such as Marathi, Hindi, Kannada, Telugu and twice in Tamil.

Soundtrack
Music was composed by M. D. Parthasarathy with P. S. Anantharaman as assistant. Parthasarathy also sang one or two songs.  Lyrics were penned by Papanasam Sivan, Kothamangalam Subbu and Sangu Subramaniam. Singers are V. Nagayya and Nagarcoil Mahadevan. Playback singers are S. S. Mani (S. Subramanian), T. V. Rathnam, Balasaraswathi and M. Kalpagam.
The song Kadhali Radhaiyai kalangavittan is set in the raga Kharaharapriya.

Reception
The film was a success at the box-office. Film historian Randor Guy wrote in 2008 that the film is "Remembered for its soul-filling music, fine photography and Nagayya’s performance."

Notes

References

External links

1948 films
1940s Tamil-language films
Indian black-and-white films
Gemini Studios films